Yarrow Shipbuilders Limited (YSL), often styled as simply Yarrows, was a major shipbuilding firm based in the Scotstoun district of Glasgow on the River Clyde. It is now part of BAE Systems Surface Ships, owned by BAE Systems, which has also operated the nearby Govan shipyard (formerly Fairfields) since 1999.

History

Origins in London
The company was founded by Alfred Yarrow, later Sir Alfred Yarrow, 1st Baronet, in the year 1865 as Yarrow & Company, Limited. Originally it was based at Folly Wall, Poplar, then in 1898 as the company grew, Yarrow moved his shipyard to London Yard, Cubitt Town. The diversification into boiler manufacturing, including large boilers for electricity generation, meant that the company survived the lean years for shipbuilding. Alfred Yarrow was an inventive naval engineer,  and was responsible for a number of novel introductions into service which led to the development of increasingly fast warships. Ultimately in the Royal Navy and abroad it became known that a "Yarrow ship was a fast ship", with the company building the first naval vessel globally to exceed 30 knots and then, later, 40 knots. Sir Alfred Yarrow was knighted for services to the war effort in 1916. He was a notable benefactor to many charities.

Move to Glasgow

Despite a move of yards, Yarrows outgrew its London site and this and the cost of land and labour in London led to a second move to what was at that time a greenfield site at Scotstoun in the west of Glasgow, beginning in 1906. Between 4,000 and 5,000 tons of material had to be transported, from models to heavy machine tools. A train-load of from forty to fifty wagons left the works at Poplar every day. The first vessel launched from the new works at Scotstoun on 14 July 1908 was the lead ship of the Pará-class destroyers for the Brazilian Navy. Sir Harold Yarrow, eldest son of Sir Alfred, supervised the move to Scotland whilst still in his early twenties, and ran the company in Scotland. The company also established the Coventry Ordnance Works joint venture in 1905, building a large factory near to its Scotstoun Shipyard in 1910. During the First World War, the company developed the pioneering Erskine artificial limb with Sir William Macewen and Sir Harold Yarrow was one of the founders of the Erskine Hospital for disabled ex-servicemen. Yarrow workshops were used to manufacture artificial limbs at no profit.

The Yarrow company was one of the world's leading builders of destroyers and frigates from early on, building ships for both the Royal Navy and numerous export customers. For many years until the 1960s Yarrow also built a large number of merchant ships, specialising particularly on Riverboat vessels for the rivers and lakes of Burma, India, Africa and South America.

Several of these vessels were built to serve on lakes that had no navigable access to deliver them by sea. They were therefore built as "knock downs"; that is, they were assembled temporarily in the shipyard, disassembled into a large number of sections and transported to the lake, and there assembled permanently and launched. Yarrow's Scotstoun yard built the "knock down" ferry  for Nyasaland in 1949. She was completed and launched on Lake Nyasa (now Lake Malawi) in 1951. The yard built three "knock down" ferries for Lake Victoria in East Africa.  was built in Scotstoun in 1960 and reassembled at the Kenyan port of Kisumu on the lake in 1961.

In total Yarrow built approximately 400 ships on the Clyde – these can be traced in detail in the Clyde-built Ship Database.

The yard continued to expand during the post-war period, acquiring and integrating the shipyard of the neighbouring Blythswood Shipbuilding Company, which had itself been founded in 1919, to the east of the Yarrow yard in 1964. The new acquisition was used by Yarrow to extend their Shipyard, with the construction of three covered building berths and a six-storey Technical Office Block undertaken in the former Blythswood shipyard site during the late 1960s, with the aid of a government grant. Other neighbouring yards was acquired to lengthen the waterfront and provide additional facilities,  the price of one being negotiated by Sir Eric Yarrow on the golf course with Sir John Hunter. Eric Yarrow had followed his father on his death as chairman in 1962,  becoming the third generation of the family to lead the firm.

During this period, Yarrow was involved in designing and building many of the Royal Navy's post-war escort fleet; including the Type 81 Tribal class, Type 14 Blackwood class and the Type 12M Rothesay-class frigates. The company was also involved in the Leander class programme.   During the 1960s ships were built for the navies of South Africa,  Chile,  Malaysia, Thailand, New Zealand and Iran.

Upper Clyde Shipbuilders and aftermath
In 1968 the Company became part of Upper Clyde Shipbuilders which collapsed in 1971. Yarrows had already left the UCS joint venture by April 1970 however, as the only profitable division of the joint venture. In 1974 it acquired the neighbouring Elderslie Dockyard, owned by Barclay Curle, which lay to the west of the Yarrow yard and included an extensive complex of three drydocks originally built in 1904 (No. 1 Dry Dock), 1933 (No. 2 Dry Dock) and 1965 (No. 3 Dry Dock).

The long-term investment in facilities and strong manufacturing credentials, combined with the development of the Yarrow Admiralty Research Department (YARD)  ensured that when the number of warship yards was dramatically reduced by the Navy in the 1970s, Yarrows was chosen as one of mainstream contractors alongside Swan Hunter, Vosper (for the Type 21s) and Cammell Laird.  The Type 21 was the first type in the Navy to be a combined Gas Turbine and Diesel design, using the marine variant of the Rolls-Royce Olympus gas turbine (also used in Concorde).  5 out of 8 Type 21s,  10 out of 14 Type 22s,  12 out of 16 Type 23s and all the Type 45s were built at Scotstoun, demonstrating the firm's dominance in the market for medium-sized RN surface vessels.  The sleek, good looks and the sporting performance of the Type 21 frigates led to the captains of the ships being called "boy racers".   The vessel could stop from full speed in twice the length of the ship.  HMS Ardent was destroyed by Argentinian aircraft in Falkland Sound in May 1982.   All of the Yarrow built Type 21s served in the Falklands

Nationalisation

In 1977 the Labour government of James Callaghan passed the Aircraft and Shipbuilding Industries Act 1977 which nationalised Yarrow (Shipbuilders), Limited, and grouped it with other major British shipyards as a division within British Shipbuilders. Nationalisation was opposed by the owners, and by the minority Conservative party. The last ship launched under private ownership was HMS Battleaxe, a Type 22 launched by Audrey Callaghan, wife of the Prime Minister. Investment continued in the yard, with the construction of a large GRP fabrication hall at the western end of the yard, adjacent to the Elderslie dry docks during the late 1970s. Dry dock No.1 was also covered over. This was in preparation for the  project, although only two vessels of the class were eventually built at Yarrow. The long-disused hall was subsequently demolished in 2008. The parent company, Yarrow PLC, retained ownership of non-shipbuilding assets, including YARD Ltd. Yarrow plc was subsequently sold to CAP Ltd in the mid-1980s, and in turn was owned by Sema Group PLC and Schlumberger.

Privatisation

The succeeding government of Margaret Thatcher began a privatisation programme and the profitable Yarrow was one of British Shipbuilders' early divestitures. It was sold in 1985 to GEC's GEC-Marconi division, becoming Marconi Marine (YSL). GEC began a programme of major capital investment, culminating in the construction of a large Module Hall, north of the covered building berths, in 1987. In 1999 Marconi Electronic Systems was sold to British Aerospace, creating BAE Systems. Marconi Marine (YSL) then became part of BAE Systems Marine. Since 2009, YSL is  part of BAE Systems Surface Ships, a BAE Systems subsidiary.

Yarrows in Canada
Yarrows Ltd. was a major ship yard located in Esquimalt, British Columbia on the west coast of Vancouver Island, Canada.  Established in 1893 as the Esquimalt Marine Railway Co., later B.C. Marine Railway Co., by W. Fitzherbert Bullen, it ran small marine railways in Victoria and Vancouver.   Sir Alfred Yarrow purchased the yard in 1913, renamed it Yarrows Ltd., and installed as manager his son, Norman Yarrow.  From its early start building ships for the Canadian Pacific Railway, the yard expanded during the First World War to repair and refit many vessels for the Royal Navy, employing up to 800 men.  In the late 1920s, the larger Esquimalt graving dock was completed.   During the Second World War the company produced corvettes, frigates, landing ships, and transport ferries for the Royal Navy and Royal Canadian Navy, as well as freighters. Other work included arming civilian ships and refitting at least one as a troop carrier.  At its peak, 3,500 men and women worked for Yarrows in the yard. After the war, the Yarrow family sold the yard to Burrard Dry Dock. The yard was closed in 1994 and the graving dock and property are now part of the Canadian Forces Base Esquimalt.

Ships built by Yarrow

Clyde-class RNLI lifeboats
 Charles H Barrett (70-001)
 Grace Paterson Ritchie (70-002)

Royal Malaysian Navy
  (F76) ex-Black Star, ex-HMS Mermaid
  (F24)
 s
  (F29)
  (F30)

References

External links

   The Clyde-built ships data base – lists over 22,000 ships built on the Clyde

Defunct shipbuilding companies of Scotland
Manufacturing companies based in Glasgow
River Clyde
Defence companies of the United Kingdom
Former defence companies of the United Kingdom
Former defence companies of Canada
Shipbuilding in London
Shipyards on the River Thames
Marine engine manufacturers
Ships built in Poplar
Ships built in Cubitt Town
Naval history of Canada
Shipbuilding companies of Canada
Engine manufacturers of the United Kingdom
British Shipbuilders